Chakra is a chess variant invented by Christian Freeling in 1980. The uniqueness of Chakra is owed to the invention of a new fairy piece named transmitter. Freeling considered an earlier version of the game as insignificant. "Then one night in the early eighties, Ed [van Zon] and I dreamed up the 'transmitter', a piece consisting of two parts called 'chakras', that would function as a 'portal' for transmitting pieces."

The game was first featured in The Gamer magazine in 1981 (issue 3), resulting in much interest and the sale of many Chakra sets. Chakra is included in 100 Other Games to Play on a Chessboard (1983, 2002) by Stephen Addison.

Overview 
Chakra is played on a standard chessboard and has many of the standard play conventions as in chess, including check and the winning objective, checkmate. Stalemate, as in chess, is a draw. The king in Chakra is named emperor. 

Each player starts with 16 pieces:  1 emperor, 1 empress, 1 samurai, 1 monk, 2 monkeys, 2 courtesans, 2 chakras, 6 swords. The emperor, empress, and monkey perform identically to their chess counterparts (king, queen, and knight, respectively). The others are governed by special fairy rules. There is no castling in Chakra.

Move rules 
 The samurai combines powers of a chess king and a chess knight. (On the chess variants page, it is said that the powers of a chess king and chess rook are combined)

 The monk combines powers of a chess king and a chess bishop.
 A sword moves like a chess pawn, except there is no en passant. (If no captured piece is available, a sword cannot promote; however, in that case it can still give check.)

The chakra "transmitter" pieces

Notes

References 

Bibliography

Further reading

External links 
 Official website MindSports.nl
 Chakra The Chess Variant Pages

Chess variants
1980 in chess
Board games introduced in 1980